General elections were held in Fiji in September 1959, the last in which women and ethnic Fijians were still barred from voting. Voting took place in the Eastern constituencies between 5 and 12 September, and in the Northern and Western and Southern constituencies on 12 September.

Electoral system
The Legislative Council consisted of 32 members, including 16 'official' members who were civil servants, fifteen 'unofficial' members (five Europeans, five Fijians and five Indo-Fijians), and the Governor sitting as President of the Council.

For Europeans and Indo-Fijians, three of the five representatives were elected from single-member constituencies, with the other two appointed by the Governor. All five Fijian members were appointed from a list of ten candidates submitted by the Great Council of Chiefs.

Voting for Europeans remained restricted to men aged 21 or over who had been born to European parents (or a European father and was able to read, speak and write English), who were British subjects and had been continuously resident in Fiji for 12 months, and who either owned at least £20 of freehold or leasehold property or had an annual income of at least £120. For Indo-Fijians, eligibility was also restricted to men aged 21 or over. They had to be a British subject or from British India, have lived continuously in the Fiji for at least two years, be able to read or write in English, Gujarati, Gurmukhi,  Hindi, Tamil, Telugu or Urdu, and for the previous six months, have either owned property with an annual value of five years, had a net annual cash income of at least £75, or held a Government or municipal licence worth at least £5 annually.

Results

Nominated members

Aftermath
A by-election was held in the Indian Eastern constituency in 1961, which was won by James Madhavan.

References

Fiji
1959 in Fiji
Elections in Fiji
1959 elections in the British Empire
September 1959 events in Oceania